The 2017 GT Series Sprint Cup, known for sponsorship reasons as the 2017 Blancpain GT Series Sprint Cup, was the fifth season of the GT Series Sprint Cup following on from the demise of the SRO Group's FIA GT1 World Championship (an auto racing series for grand tourer cars), the fourth with the designation of Blancpain Sprint Series or Blancpain GT Series Sprint Cup.

Calendar
At the annual press conference during the 2016 24 Hours of Spa on 29 July, the Stéphane Ratel Organisation announced the first draft of the 2017 calendar. The series started at Misano on 2 April and ended at the Nürburgring on 17 September. Zandvoort would make its return on the schedule after a one-year absence, replacing the round in Barcelona, but on 7 November the SRO announced the finalised calendar, confirming Zandvoort had been replaced by Zolder. The finalised calendar also showed the series would return to the Hungaroring.

Entry list

Race results
Bold indicates overall winner.

Championship standings
Scoring system
Championship points were awarded for the first six positions in each Qualifying Race and for the first ten positions in each Main Race. The pole-sitter in the Qualifying Race also received one point and entries were required to complete 75% of the winning car's race distance in order to be classified and earn points. Individual drivers were required to participate for a minimum of 25 minutes in order to earn championship points in any race.

Qualifying Race points

Main Race points

Drivers' championships

Overall

Pro-Am Cup

Silver Cup

Am Cup

Teams' championships

Overall

Pro-Am Cup

Silver Cup

Am Cup

See also
2017 Blancpain GT Series
2017 Blancpain GT Series Endurance Cup
2017 Blancpain GT Series Asia

Notes

References

External links

 Sprint Cup